Bagal may refer to:

Bagal (surname), family name
Bagal (caste), cattle herding caste of East India

See also
Bagel (disambiguation)